NAIA regions no longer exist. The following is a list of former National Association of Intercollegiate Athletics regions.

Region I of the NAIA
Cascade Collegiate Conference
Frontier Conference
Independents:
University of Alberta
University of British Columbia

University of Victoria

Region II of the NAIA
California Pacific Conference
Golden State Athletic Conference
Independents:

Region III of the NAIA  
Great Plains Athletic Conference
North Star Athletic Association
Independents:
University of Regina

Region IV of the NAIA 
Kansas Collegiate Athletic Conference
Midlands Collegiate Athletic Conference

Region V of the NAIA
American Midwest Conference
Heart of America Athletic Conference
Independents:

Region VI of the NAIA
Red River Athletic Conference
Sooner Athletic Conference
Independents:

Region VII of the NAIA
Chicagoland Collegiate Athletic Conference
Midwest Collegiate Conference

Region VIII of the NAIA
Crossroads League
Wolverine-Hoosier Athletic Conference
Independents 
University of Windsor

Region IX of the NAIA
American Mideast Conference
Independent:

Region X of the NAIA 
Sunrise Athletic Conference
Independent:
State University of New York at Delhi

Region XI of the NAIA
TranSouth Athletic Conference
Mid-South Conference

Region XII of the NAIA
Appalachian Athletic Conference
River States Conference
Independents:
Morris College 
Voorhees College

Region XIII of the NAIA
Gulf Coast Athletic Conference
Southern States Athletic Conference

Region XIV of the NAIA
The Sun Conference

External links
 NAIA Regions

Regions